Lichty is an unincorporated community in Yakima County, Washington, United States, located between Sunnyside and Grandview on U.S. Route 12.

Lichty was known as Esjay until 1907 when  the North Yakima and Valley Railway Company completed its Sunnyside line. The town was named after the Peter J. Lichty family whose property was acquired for the right of way for the line. The town had a post office from July 11, 1913 to February 15, 1917.

References

Northern Pacific Railway
Unincorporated communities in Yakima County, Washington
Unincorporated communities in Washington (state)